Podiappuhamy H. P. Piyasena (born 3 April 1961) is a Sri Lankan politician and former Member of Parliament.

Early life
Piyasena was born on 3 April 1961.

Career
Piyasena was one of the Tamil National Alliance's candidates in Ampara District at the 2010 parliamentary election. He was elected and entered Parliament. Piyasena was the first Sinhalese to be elected parliament from a Tamil political party (his father is Sinhalese and his mother is Tamil).

In September 2010 Piyasena defected to the ruling United People's Freedom Alliance (UPFA). He was one of the UPFA's candidates in Ampara District at the 2015 parliamentary election but failed to get re-elected after coming eighth amongst the UPFA candidates.

Electoral history

References

1961 births
Living people
Members of the 14th Parliament of Sri Lanka
People from Eastern Province, Sri Lanka
Sinhalese politicians
Sri Lankan Buddhists
Sri Lankan Tamil politicians
Tamil National Alliance politicians
United People's Freedom Alliance politicians